Euonymus sachalinensis (syn. Euonymus planipes), the flat-stalked spindle, is a species of flowering plant in the family Celastraceae, native to Japan, China, Korea, and the Island of Sakhalin (whence the specific epithet sachalinensis).

This plant is cultivated as an ornamental subject. The cultivar 'Sancho' which is more free-flowering than its parent, is a recipient of the Royal Horticultural Society's Award of Garden Merit.

References

 

sachalinensis
Flora of China
Flora of Japan
Flora of Korea